Rancho Rodeo de las Aguas was a  land grant in present day Beverly Hills, Los Angeles County, California given to María Rita Quinteros Valdez de Villa in 1838.

Rancho Rodeo de las Aguas (Ranch of the Gathering Waters), is named for the streams that emptied into the area from out of the canyons of the Santa Monica Mountains above it, the Cañada de las Aguas Frias (Glen of the Cold Waters, now Coldwater Canyon) and Cañada de los Encinos (Glen of the Green Oaks, now Benedict Canyon).

History
Maria Rita Valdez was a granddaughter of Luis Quintero one of the original settlers of Los Angeles. Maria was married to Spanish colonial soldier, Vicente Fernando Villa (–1841).
With the cession of California to the United States following the Mexican–American War, the 1848 Treaty of Guadalupe Hidalgo provided that the land grants would be honored.

The rancho was sold in 1854 to Benjamin D. Wilson and Major Henry Hancock. Hancock later sold his share to William Workman. Lots were platted of about five acres each, but dry weather came and the land reverted to the sheep.

The land next passed into the hands of Henry Hammel and Andrew H. Denker, owners of the United States Hotel at Main and Market Streets in Los Angeles, and became "one vast field of lima beans", supplying the culinary needs of the owners' Hotel. The bean fields survived until 1900 when the land was sold to Burton E. Green of the Amalgamated Oil Company for oil development. After drilling many unproductive wells, they reorganized as the Rodeo Land and Water Company in 1906.

See also

Rodeo Drive

References

I think Mariá Rita Quinteros Valdez de Villa was painted by Ignacio Maria Barreda 18 century

External links
  Exterior view of an adobe on the Hammel and Denker ranch, formerly Rancho Rodeo de Las Aguas in Beverly Hills, 1920

Rodeo de las Aguas
Ranchos of Los Angeles County, California
History of Los Angeles
Beverly Hills, California
1838 establishments in Alta California
19th century in Los Angeles